Nodule Nunatak is a small but prominent isolated nunatak, 440 m, standing 3 nautical miles (6 km) south of Mount Tholus in the southern part of Joinville Island. Surveyed by the Falkland Islands Dependencies Survey (FIDS) in 1953–54. The descriptive name was given by the United Kingdom Antarctic Place-Names Committee (UK-APC) in 1956.

Nunataks of Graham Land
Landforms of the Joinville Island group